are a set of twelve bells used in  dance. The set consists of three tiers of bells suspended by coiled brass wires from a central handle: two bells on the top tier, four bells on the middle tier, and six bells for the bottom tier. The shape of the bells are thought to have been inspired from the fruits of the  tree (Michelia compressa).

The term  refers to small bells in general, but can refer to two Japanese instruments associated with Shinto ritual:  
 A single large crotal bell similar in shape to a sleigh bell and having a slit on one side.  
 A handheld bell-tree with small crotal bells strung in three levels on a spiraling wire.

The larger form may be hung from a rafter in front of a Shinto shrine and sounded by a robe or ribbons that hang within reach of the worshipper. The smaller  is supported atop a handle and is held by female shrine attendants costumed in traditional robes, white-powdered faces, and wearing Heian-period coiffure during performances of  dances.

 is a term encompassing Shinto instrumental music, songs, and dances performed at shrines and at court. It was formalized as early as 773 CE, when it appeared in the palace repertoire. These small bells, ritual implements of great antiquity, may also be grouped together in bundles for folk and ceremonial performances.

Gallery

See also
 Glossary of Shinto

References 

Japanese musical instruments
Kagura
Talismans
Shinto in Japan
Exorcism in Shinto
Sacred musical instruments
Percussion idiophones